Amsonia ciliata, the fringed bluestar, is a North American species of flowering plant in the dogbane family, first described in 1788.

References 

ciliata
Flora of Arkansas
Flora of Oklahoma
Plants described in 1788
Flora without expected TNC conservation status